"Ain't Misbehavin" is a 1929 stride jazz/early swing song.  Andy Razaf wrote the lyrics to a score by Thomas "Fats" Waller and Harry Brooks for the Broadway musical comedy play Connie's Hot Chocolates.

First performances
The song was first performed at the premiere of Connie's Hot Chocolates in Harlem at Connie's Inn as an opening song by Paul Bass and Margaret Simms, and repeated later in the musical by Russell Wooding's Hallelujah Singers. Connie's Hot Chocolates was transferred to the Hudson Theatre on Broadway during June 1929, where it was renamed to Hot Chocolates and where Louis Armstrong became the orchestra director. The script also required Armstrong to play "Ain't Misbehavin" in a trumpet solo, and although this was initially slated only to be a reprise of the opening song, Armstrong's performance was so well received that the trumpeter was asked to climb out of the orchestra pit and play the piece on stage. As noted by Thomas Brothers in his book Louis Armstrong: Master of Modernism, Armstrong was first taught "Ain't Misbehavin by Waller himself, "woodshedding" it until he could "play all around it"; he cherished it "because it was 'one of those songs you could cut loose and swing with.

Recordings
During the first half of the 20th century, when a tune was successful in terms of sheet music sold, it was typically recorded by several different artists. All six "Ain't Misbehavin" recordings of 1929 were successes in the American Society of Composers, Authors and Publishers (ASCAP) rankings for that year:
 Leo Reisman and his orchestra (with vocals by Lew Conrad, No. 2).
 Louis Armstrong (No. 7).
 Bill Robinson (with Irving Mills & his Hotsy Totsy Gang, No. 8).
 Gene Austin (with Leonard Joy & his orchestra, No. 9).
 Ruth Etting (No. 16).
 Fats Waller (instrumental version, No. 17).
Waller re-recorded the song with vocals for the 1943 movie Stormy Weather. Waller's recording received the Grammy Hall of Fame Award during 1984, during 2001, it was one of 365 Songs of the Century selected by the RIAA, 
and it was one of fifty recordings selected for inclusion in the National Recording Registry by the Library of Congress during 2004.

Ain't Misbehavin has been recorded by many other performers over the years, including Seger Ellis, Anita O'Day, Sarah Vaughan (for "Sarah Vaughan in Hi-Fi"; 1950), Bing Crosby (for "Songs I Wish I Had Sung the First Time Around"), Billie Holiday, Eartha Kitt, Ella Fitzgerald, Carol Channing, Django Reinhardt, Harry James, Miles Davis, Kay Starr, Frankie Laine, Art Tatum, Floyd Pepper, Sonny Stitt, Sam Cooke, Johnnie Ray, Sidney Bechet, Ray Charles, Nat King Cole, Elkie Brooks, Eyran Katsenelenbogen, Willie Nelson, Kermit Ruffins, Leon Redbone, Freddie White, Dave Brubeck, Johnny Hartman, Hank Williams Jr., Robson Green and Jerome Flynn (Mini TV series UK, 1997), and Bill Haley & His Comets (who recorded a rock and roll version during 1957). Johnnie Ray's version scored No. 17 in the UK Singles Chart during May 1956.

In 1960, Tommy Bruce and the Bruisers had a number 3 hit in the UK Singles Chart with their cover version of the song. 
During 1976, Leon Redbone performed the song on Saturday Night Live. It served as the title song of the successful 1978 musical Ain't Misbehavin'. Country music artist Hank Williams Jr. recorded a version for his 1985 studio album Five-O. Released as a single, the song peaked at No. 1 on Billboard's Hot Country Singles chart and earned Williams a Grammy Award nomination for Best Country Vocal Performance, Male.

Movie renditions
1943 Stormy Weather - performed by Fats Waller
1944 Atlantic City - sung by Louis Armstrong
1948 You Were Meant for Me
1955 Gentlemen Marry Brunettes - sung and danced by Alan Young, Jane Russell, Jeanne Crain (dubbed by Anita Ellis) and Chorus
1975 Lucky Lady - Burt Reynolds sang the song on a ship in this comedy
1979 Just You and Me, Kid
2008 Be Kind Rewind - Performed by Mos Def, although Fats Waller's rendition is also heard

See also
List of 1920s jazz standards

References

1929 songs
1975 singles
1986 singles
Hank Williams Jr. songs
Songs with music by Fats Waller
Louis Armstrong songs
Bill Haley songs
Johnnie Ray songs
United States National Recording Registry recordings
Songs written by Andy Razaf
Song recordings produced by Jimmy Bowen
Grammy Hall of Fame Award recipients
1920s jazz standards
Warner Records singles
Curb Records singles
Victor Records singles
Jazz compositions in E-flat major
Jazz compositions in C major
Okeh Records singles